"Sexy People (The Fiat Song)" is a song by Italian singer-songwriter Arianna. The song was released as a single on February 1, 2013. The song features vocals from American singer and rapper Pitbull. It uses portions of the Italian song called "Torna a Surriento" composed in 1902 by Ernesto De Curtis.

The song is used to promote the Fiat 500 automobiles in the U.S.

Track listing

 Digital download

"Sexy People (The Fiat Song)" – 3:28
"Sexy People [Italian Version]" – 3:17
"Sexy People [Spanish Version]" – 3:27

Music video
The official music video was released onto Arianna's official VEVO channel on April 26, 2013 and was directed by Rich Lee. It stars Pitbull on a pleasure boat with several women dancing around him. It features cameos by Adrienne Bailon, Dwayne Bowe, Chad Johnson, Dez Bryant, DJ Irie, Keana Texeira, Tristan Thompson, Tyson Ritter, Charlie Sheen and Shaggy.  As of July 2017, the video has received over 17 million views.

The music video for the "Italian Version" was released onto Arianna's official VEVO channel on May 14, 2013. As of July 2017, the video has received over 1.2 million views.

Chart performance

Weekly charts

Year-end charts

References

2013 singles
Pitbull (rapper) songs
Songs written by Pitbull (rapper)
2013 songs
RCA Records singles
Songs written by DJ Buddha
Songs written by Danny Mercer
Music videos directed by Rich Lee